State Route 28 (SR 28) is a  state highway in the western part of the U.S. state of Alabama. The highway’s western terminus is at an intersection with SR 17 at Emelle in northwestern Sumter County, and its eastern terminus is at an intersection with SR 21 near Darlington in eastern Wilcox County.

Route description

From its beginning in Sumter County, SR 28 travels in a general southeastern trajectory through Livingston, the home of the University of West Alabama. After leaving Livingston, the highway travels through the Black Belt region of Alabama, one of the state’s poorest regions. The only towns whose population exceeds 2,000 that SR 28 travels through are Livingston, Linden, and Camden.

Major intersections

See also

References

028
Transportation in Sumter County, Alabama
Transportation in Marengo County, Alabama
Transportation in Wilcox County, Alabama